Barbara Field is a playwright whose work has been seen at theaters across North America and Europe.

Education
Field is a graduate of the University of Pennsylvania (BA) and the University of Minnesota (MA).

Career
She has written adaptations of such great works of literature as Great Expectations and A Christmas Carol, both by Charles Dickens, and of Scaramouche, by Rafael Sabatini. Great Expectations won the L.A. Drama critics award in 1996. Other plays include Neutral Countries, co-winner of the Humana Festival's Great American Play contest in 1983, and Boundary Waters, for which she received a DramaLogue Award in 1992. She also authored three books, New Classics from the Guthrie Stage(Smith and Kraus) and Barbara Field, Collected Plays, Vol I & II (Amazon).

Field is a co-founder of The Playwrights' Center and served as playwright-in-residence at the Guthrie Theater from 1974–1981.

Honorable recognitions
She has held fellowships from numerous organizations; the Shubert, Bush, McKnight, and Minnesota State Arts Board fellowships are among her many awards.

Personal life
Field lives in Minneapolis.

References

External links
 
 

20th-century American dramatists and playwrights
University of Pennsylvania alumni
University of Minnesota alumni
1935 births
Living people